Naomi Zigmond is an American education scholar, currently a Distinguished Professor at the University of Pittsburgh. Her research involves child education and classroom education.

References

Year of birth missing (living people)
Living people
University of Pittsburgh faculty